Joseph Alan Cowley (born August 15, 1958) is an American former professional baseball pitcher, who played in Major League Baseball (MLB) for the Atlanta Braves (1982), New York Yankees (1984–1985), Chicago White Sox (1986), and Philadelphia Phillies (1987). On September 19, 1986, Cowley threw a no-hitter for the White Sox against the California Angels.

Early career
Cowley was signed as an undrafted free agent out of Lafayette High School by the Atlanta Braves in 1976.

1986: Strikeout record and no-hitter 
On May 28, 1986, Cowley set the then-major league record for striking out the most consecutive batters to start a game when he struck out the first seven Texas Rangers that he faced. Despite the feat, Cowley lost the game, surrendering five earned runs in less than five innings before being removed.

On September 19 of that same year, Cowley pitched a 7-1 no-hitter against the California Angels at Anaheim Stadium. After the eighth inning, with Cowley just three outs away, approximately one-third of the 28,647 fans in attendance left the stadium, in keeping with the perception that sports fans in Southern California are more concerned with avoiding traffic than watching games. The no-hitter was also memorable because Cowley threw as many balls as he did strikes (69), walking seven men and surrendering one earned run. After the game, Angels first baseman Wally Joyner said: "Not to put Joe Cowley down, but it wasn't impressive."

Cowley did not win again in 1986, and after four winless starts in 1987, was released by the Phillies. Cowley thus became the only pitcher in MLB history never to win another game after pitching a no-hitter.

See also
 List of Major League Baseball no-hitters

References

External links

Joe Cowley at SABR (Baseball BioProject)
Joe Cowley at Baseball Almanac
Joe Cowley at Baseballbiography.com
Joe Cowley at Pura Pelota (Venezuelan Professional Baseball League)

1958 births
Atlanta Braves players
Baseball players from Kentucky
Buffalo Bisons (minor league) players
Chicago White Sox players
Columbus Clippers players
Durham Bulls players
Greenwood Braves players
Gulf Coast Braves players
Kingsport Braves players
Leones del Caracas players
American expatriate baseball players in Venezuela
Living people
Maine Guides players
Major League Baseball pitchers
New York Yankees players
Philadelphia Phillies players
Richmond Braves players
Savannah Braves players